Parlin is an unincorporated community located within Old Bridge Township and Sayreville Borough in Middlesex County, New Jersey, United States. The area is served as United States Postal Service ZIP Code 08859.

As of the 2000 United States Census, the population for ZIP Code Tabulation Area (ZCTA) 08859 was 20,129.

Notable people
People who were born in, residents of, or otherwise closely associated with Parlin include:
 Jon Bon Jovi (born 1962), lead singer of the rock band Bon Jovi
 Junot Díaz (born 1968), Dominican-American writer
 Jehyve Floyd (born 1997), basketball player in the Israeli Basketball Premier League.
 Tom Kelly (born 1950), former manager for the Minnesota Twins
 Kevin Mulvey (born 1985), former pitcher for the Minnesota Twins and Arizona Diamondbacks

See also
List of neighborhoods in Sayreville, New Jersey

References

External links

Old Bridge Township, New Jersey
Neighborhoods in Sayreville, New Jersey
Unincorporated communities in Middlesex County, New Jersey
Unincorporated communities in New Jersey